Ugiodes is a genus of moths in the family Erebidae.

Species
Ugiodes cinerea Hampson, 1926
Ugiodes vagulalis Viette, 1956

Former species
Ugiodes geometriformis Strand, 1915

References

External links
Natural History Museum Lepidoptera genus database

 
Acantholipini
Moth genera